Swan Hunter, formerly known as Swan Hunter & Wigham Richardson, is a shipbuilding design, engineering, and management company, based in Wallsend, Tyne and Wear, England.

At its apex, the company represented the combined forces of three powerful shipbuilding families: Swan, Hunter and Wigham Richardson.

In 2006 Swan Hunter ceased vessel construction on Tyneside, but continues to provide design engineering services.

History
Swan & Hunter was founded by George Burton Hunter, who formed a partnership with the widow of Charles Sheridan Swan (the owner of a Wallsend Shipbuilding business established in 1852 by Charles Mitchell) under the name in 1880.

In 1903, C.S. Swan & Hunter merged with Wigham Richardson (founded by John Wigham Richardson as Neptune Works in 1860), specifically to bid for the important contract to build  on behalf of Cunard. Their bid was successful, and the new company, Swan Hunter and Wigham Richardson Ltd, went on to build what was to become, in its day, the most famous oceangoing liner in the world. Also in 1903 the Company took a controlling interest in the Wallsend Slipway & Engineering Company, which was an early licensed manufacturer of Parsons steam turbine engines, which enabled Mauretania to achieve her great speed. Mauretania was launched from Wallsend on 20 September 1906 by the Duchess of Roxburghe. The firm expanded rapidly in the early part of the twentieth century, acquiring the Glasgow-based Barclay Curle in 1912.

In 1966, Swan Hunter & Wigham Richardson merged with Smiths Dock Company to form Associated Shipbuilders, which later became Swan Hunter Group. Following the publication of the Geddes Report recommending rationalisation in British shipbuilding, the Company went on to acquire Clelands Shipbuilding Company and John Readhead & Sons in 1967. Meanwhile, Swan Hunter inherited both the Naval Yard at High Walker on the River Tyne of Vickers-Armstrongs and the Hebburn Yard of Hawthorn Leslie in 1968. In 1973 further expansion came with the purchase of Palmers Dock at Hebburn from Vickers-Armstrongs.

Then in 1977, Swan Hunter Group was nationalised as part of British Shipbuilders. The former flagship of the Royal Navy,  was built at Swan Hunter during this period, entering service in 1985.

The Company was privatised again in 1987 but decided to close its Neptune Yard in 1988. The receiver took steps to break up the business. However, the main shipyard in Wallsend was bought out from receivership by Jaap Kroese, a Dutch millionaire. The yard subsequently undertook several ad-hoc ship repair and conversion projects for private-sector customers.

In 2000, Swan Hunter was awarded the contract to design and build two (Auxiliary) Landing Ship Dock ships for the Royal Fleet Auxiliary with two other ships being built by BAE Systems Naval Ships: the cost of the two Swan Hunter ships was to be £210 million including £62 million for lead yard services, with an inservice date of 2004. By July 2006, the costs had risen to £309 million and only one ship had been delivered. As result of this, the second ship  was transferred to BAE Systems Govan in Glasgow for completion.

In 2001, Swan Hunter acquired Kværner's Port Clarence offshore yard at Teesside but then in 2006 sold it to Wilton Engineering Group.

In November 2006, after the failure to complete Lyme Bay within budget and resulting exclusion from future Royal Navy shipbuilding projects, Jaap Kroese announced that the business was effectively finished and placed the Wallsend Yard's iconic cranes up for sale. He also said that he was actively looking for a buyer for the land. During this time, Lyme Bays earlier sister ship, Largs Bay, was noted as the last ship to be built and fully completed by Swan Hunter. In April 2007, Swan Hunter's cranes, along with its floating dock and other equipment, were sold to Bharati Shipyards, India's second-largest private-sector shipbuilder. The entire plant machinery and equipment from Swan Hunter was dismantled and transported to India over six months to be rebuilt at Bharati Shipyards.

Swan's performed the conceptual design of Pioneering Spirit, provisionally named Pieter Schelte, the world's largest platform installation/decommissioning and pipelay vessel. The basic design of the lifting systems was completed by the end of 2008, and detail design of the hulls by May 2010.

In 2008, the company said it was concentrating on ship design with just under 200 people employed.

In 2016, Jaap Kroese died but the company said it would continue with its business of ship design. At the time, the company had 40 employees and contractors.

Also in 2016, Swan Hunter was relaunched into the subsea industry by Gerard Kroese, the eldest son of former owner Jaap Kroese. Swan Hunter started to offer specialist equipment, design, engineering & project management services to the offshore renewables and subsea oil & gas energy markets. On 12 October 2016, the company announced the issue of a letter of intent for the design and build of a basket carousel loading tower. The company announced further equipment pool growth through a 15Te tensioner and 450Te reel drive system. Swan Hunter announced loading tower readiness on 5 May 2017 with completion of mobilisation onto EMAS Chiyoda Subsea's multi-lay vessel 'Lewek Constellation' shortly thereafter.

Operations
The Company owned three main yards:
 The Neptune Yard at Walker-on-Tyne inherited from Wigham Richardson (opened in 1860 and closed in 1988)
 The Wallsend West Yard at Wallsend inherited from Charles Sheridan Swan (opened in 1842 and closed in 2006)
 The Naval Yard at High Walker inherited from Vickers-Armstrongs (opened in 1912 and closed during the 1980s)
All three were on the north side of River Tyne. The company also owned the Wallsend Slipway & Engineering Company, the yard that built the engines for the Mauretania, from 1903 until the 1980s. At various times Swan Hunter also owned Palmers Hebburn Yard, Hawthorn Leslie Hebburn Yard and Readheads at South Shields which were all on the south side of the River Tyne.

Ships built by Swan Hunter

Naval vessels
 
 
 s
 
 
 
 
 
 
 
  (1942)
 
  (1938)
 s
  (1940)
  (1941)
 
 
 s
 
 
 
 
 
 
 s
 
 
 
 
 
 
 
 
 
 
 
 
 
 s
 
 s
 
 
 s
 
 
 H-class destroyers
 
 
 J-class destroyer
 
 K-class destroyer
 
 M-class destroyer
 
 
 
 
 
 
 
 
 U and V-class destroyer
 
 
 
 
 V-class destroyers
 
 
 
 W-class destroyers
 
 
 Type 82 destroyer
 
 Type 42 destroyers
 
 
 
 
 Type 14 (or Blackwood-class) anti-submarine frigates
 
 
 Type 22 frigates
 
 
 
 Type 23 frigates
 
 
 
 
 
 
 
 
 
 
 
 
 s
  (1973)
  (1973)
 s
 
  – Completed by BAE Systems
  (1977)
Commercial vessels
  (1920)
 Achiever (circa 1984)
 
 Antarctic (1913)
 Arawa (1907) 
 Ariosto (1940)
 Atlantic Causeway (1969)
 Atlantic Conveyor (1970)
 Augustina (1927)
 Aurania (1916)
 Ascania (1911)
 Badagry Palm (1) (1956)
 Bamenda Palm (1) (1958)
 Bello (1930)
 British Admiral (1917)
 British Character (1941)
 British Coast (1919)
 British Colony (1927)
 British Diligence (1937)
 British Dominion (1928)
 British Empress (1917)
 British Endurance (1936)
 British Fame (1936)
 British Fusilier (1923)
 British Governor (1926)
 British Gratitude (1942)
 British Grenadier (1922)
 British Gunner (1922)
 British Harmony (1941)
 British Hussar (1923)
 British Influence (1939)
 
 British Petrol (1925)
 British Pluck (1928)
 British Resolution (1937)
 British Respect (1943)
 British Sailor (1918)
 British Scout (1922)
 British Star (1918)
 British Tenacity (1939)
 British Thrift (1928)
 British Union (1927)
 British Virtue (1945)
 British Viscount (1921)
 CA Larsen (1913)
 RMS Carpathia (1902)
 City of Canterbury (1922)
 City of Lyons (1926)
 City of Oxford (1926)
 City of Paris (1922)
 Corte (1906) 
 Coslar (1906) 
  (1976)
 Dimboola (1912)
  (1938)
  (1965)
 
  (1947)
 Elmina Palm (1957)
 Enugu Palm (1958)
 Franconia (1910)
 Frontenac (1928)
 Germanic (1931)
 Ghandara (circa 1976)
 Ibadan Palm (1959)
 Ikeja Palm (1961)
 Ilesha Palm (1961)
 Ilorin Palm (1959)
 Inanda (1925)
 Imbricaria (1935)
  (1899)
 Jean Brillant (1935)
 Kano Palm (1958)
 Katsina Palm (1957)
 Kittiwake (1906) 
  (1929)
  (1973)
  (1913)
 
 
 Lagos Palm (1961)
  (1952)
 Lida (1938)
 Lindenfels (1906) 
 Lobito Palm (1960)
 Lowenburg (1907) 
 Matadi Palm (1970)
 
 Megantic (1962)
  (1921)
 Mitra (1912)
 Moyra (1931)
 Mytilus (1916)
 Neverita (1944)
 Nidarnes (1926)
 Northenden (1886) For Manchester Sheffield and Lincolnshire Railway - later Great Central Railway
 Opopo Palm (1942)
 
 
 
 
 
 
  (1928)
 
 
 
 
 
 
 
 
 
 
 
 
 
 
 
 Powerful (1903)
 
 
 Príncipe Perfeito (1961)
 Provence (1951)
 Ranella (1912)
 
 Rauenfels (1907) 
  (1912)
 Rosalind (1890)
 Saint Clair (1929)
 Sir Parkes (1951)
 South Africa (1930)
 Spartan (1890)
 Stephano (1965)
 Toiler (1910)
 Venezia (1907) 
 
 Vikingen III (1929)
 Vistafjord (1972)
  (1938)
 Waterford (1912)
 SS Warrington (1886) For Manchester Sheffield and Lincolnshire Railway – later Great Central Railway)
 Zenda (1932)

Cable ships
 Alert
 All America
 Ariel
 Bullfinch
 Bullfrog
 Bullhead
 Cambria
 Colonia
 Dominia
 Edward Wilshaw
 Emile Baudot 
 Guardian
 Iris
 John W. Mackay
 Lord Kelvin
 Marie Louise Mackay
 Monarch
 Pacific Guardian (1984)
 Patrol
 Recorder
 Sir Eric Sharp (Launched 1988 – renamed CS IT Intrepid )
 St. Margarets
 Stanley Angwin
 Telconia

Bulk Carrier
 Hoegh Duke (1984)
 Robkap IV (1977)
 Liverpool Bridge Renamed to the MV Derbyshire (1976)

Research Vessels
  (1913)
  (later renamed HMCS Charny)
  Polar survey

Tankers
 Shell Supplier (1946)
 ARA Punta Médanos (1950)
 Velutina (1950)
 Velletia (1952)
 Helix (1953)
 Helcion (1954)
 Heldia (1955)
 Helisoma (1956)
 Volvula (1956)
 Llanishen (1957)
 Zaphon (1957)
 Varicella (1959)
 Solen (1961)
 Ottawa (1964)
 Sir Winston Churchill (1964)
 Clementine Churchill (1965)
 Narica (1967)
 Nacella (1968)
 Esso Northumbria (1969)
 Esso Hibernia (1970)
 Texaco Great Britain (1971)
 London Lion (1972)
 World Unicorn (1973)
 Windsor Lion (1974)
 Tyne Pride (1975)
 Everett F. Wells (1976)
 BP Achiever (1983)

Battleship Potemkin
On 1 May 2006, British pop-duo Pet Shop Boys performed their soundtrack to the 1925 Soviet silent-film Battleship Potemkin alongside the Royal Northern Sinfonia at the shipyard.

See also
 List of shipbuilders and shipyards

References

Further reading

External links 

 
 Iconic images of tankers being built at Swan Hunter 1970s
 Oral histories from ex-Swan Hunter shipyard workers and images of the site, collected by Tyne & Wear Museums & Archives Service

1880 establishments in England
Companies based in Tyne and Wear
Manufacturing companies established in 1880
Shipbuilding companies of England
Former defence companies of the United Kingdom
British Shipbuilders